Bondo Constituency is an electoral constituency in Kenya. It is one of six constituencies in Siaya County. Lake Victoria border it on the west and south west, Rarieda Constituency border it on the South West to the Eastern side and River Yala on the North. 
Its major and biggest town is Bondo town. Usenge, Nyamonye, Nyang'oma and K'Oppolo are other town centers.

Members of Parliament

Wards

References 

Constituencies in Siaya County
Constituencies in Nyanza Province